Leptodiaptomus ashlandi is a calanoid copepod zooplankton native to the Laurentian Great Lakes and their basin.

Distribution
Leptodiaptomus ashlandi is a zooplankton species widely distributed across Canada and the northern half of the United States in large deep lakes.  It occurs in all the Great Lakes.

Morphology
Adult females of L. ashlandi can be distinguished by their two-segmented urosome and asymmetrical, rounded metasomal wings.  Males are characterized by a large lateral spine on leg 5, located in the proximal third of the terminal segment, and by the presence of a slender process on the third segment from the distal end of the right antennule. This species is morphologically similar to other leptodiaptomids (Leptodiaptomus minutus, L. sicilis) and skistodiaptomids (Skistodiaptomus oregonensis).

Ecology
Leptodiaptomus ashlandi are known prey items for a number of native and non-native Great Lakes fishes. They are also prey items for other invertebrate zooplankton. Remains have been found within gut-contents of Mysis diluviana and are trophically below Limnocalanus macrurus.

References

Diaptomidae
Freshwater crustaceans of North America
Crustaceans described in 1893